Yansen Tipa Padan is an Indonesian politician and current vice governor of North Kalimantan. Previously he was regent of Malinau Regency. Born in village of Pa'Upan, Nunukan Regency, he continued his education in Samarinda in politics, gained bachelor and then gained doctor in administration on University of Brawijaya. He is of Dayak ethnic. He was accused by Indonesia Corruption Watch of taking bribes regarding illegal logging in Malinau Regency.

References 

1960 births
Living people
Indonesian politicians